Thénault, Thenault is a French surname. Notable people with the surname include: 

Georges Thenault (1887–1948), French commander of the Lafayette Escadrille
Marion Thénault (born 2000), Canadian freestyle skier

French-language surnames